Seyyed Abdollah Fateminia (1946 – 16 May 2022) was an Iranian Shiite cleric, professor of Islamic ethics, orator, Islamic historian and bibliographer. He researched Arabic poetry, hadith, ethics and mysticism. His religious sermons were often broadcast on Iranian television, so he was a well-known religious figure in Iran.

Life and education
Seyyed Abdollah Fateminia was born in 1946 in Tabriz, Iran. As a child, he learned religious and scientific lessons from his father, Ayatollah Seyyed Ismail Shendabadi. Then, for about 30 years, he studied under Allameh Mostafavi, one of Ali Qazi Tabatabai's students, and was educated by him. At the same time, he pursued his Islamic seminary education. After Allameh Mostafavi, he studied under Islamic scholars such as Allameh Tabatabai, Seyyed Mohammad Hassan Elahi Tabatabai (younger brother of Allameh Tabatabai), Muhammad Taqi Amoli, Seyed Reza Bahaadini, Mohammad-Taqi Bahjat Foumani, Mohammad-Taqi Ja'fari, and…. Most of his masters were students of Ali Qazi Tabatabai in Islamic sciences and mysticism. Hence, Fateminia was one of the students of Ali Qazi Tabatabai through an intermediary.

Career
Seyyed Abdollah Fateminia was one of the experts in Islamic sciences who was also engaged in research in this field; His other activities included teaching in the Islamic seminaries, attending religious programs on Iran's radio and television as an expert, and lecturing in seminaries and universities. Fateminia had a wide knowledge about the science of rijal and theoretical mysticism, but he was mostly engaged in sermons in public forums. He was considered one of the famous commentators of Al-Sahifa al-Sajjadiyya and Nahj al-Balagha and gave many lectures in these cases.

Bibliography
Fateminia's books are in Persian and in the field of Islamic awareness and Shiite concepts:

 Nokteh ha az Gofteh ha (Tips from sayings): Excerpts from the lectures of Master Fateminia, compiled by Habib Kazemi, three-volume, 2006.
 Farhange Entezaar (The culture of waiting): About occultation of Mahdi and other Islamic issues, 1996.
 Farjaame Eshq (The fate of love): A commentary on the sonnet of Imam Khomeini, Persian & Urdu, 1990.
 Yek Nokteh az Hezaran (A tip from the thousands): Republishing the speeches of Master Fateminia, two-volume: first volume republishing of Farhange Entezaar and second volume republishing of Farjaame Eshq, 2006.
 Armaqaane Ghadir (The gift of Ghadir): Forty hadiths from Shiite and Sunni sources about Ghadir, 1993.
 Sharh va Tafsire Ziyarat Jami'ah Kabirah (Description and interpretation of the Ziyarat Jami'ah Kabirah): The text of the ten lectures of Master Fateminia on the description and interpretation of the Ziyarat Jami'ah Kabirah, compiled by Mohammad Rahmati Shahreza, 2004.
 Rowzehaye Ostaad Fateminia (The anthems of Master Fateminia): The texts of Rawda Khwani lectures of Master Fateminia, compiled by Mohammad Rahmati Shahreza, 2005.
 Naghmeh Asheqi (The loving anthem): The texts of Rawda Khwani lectures of Master Fateminia, compiled by Mohammad Rahmati Shahreza, 2005.

His articles have also been published in various journals of Iran.

See also

References

External links
 Love of Hadrat Fatima (sa) - Ayatollah Fateminia
 Abdollah Fateminia lecture videos
 The Holy Lady Of Qom Sayyida Fatima Masuma (A) - Ayatollah Fatimi Nia

1946 births
2022 deaths
Iranian Shia clerics
Iranian Shia scholars of Islam
People from Tabriz
Religion academics
Iranian Muslim mystics
Shia clerics from Tabriz